The Trusts (Capital and Income) Act 2013 (c. 1) is an Act of the Parliament of the United Kingdom which amends the law relating to capital and income in trusts in the United Kingdom.

References

United Kingdom Acts of Parliament 2013